111th Regiment or 111th Infantry Regiment may refer to:

 111th Regiment of Foot (Loyal Birmingham Volunteers), a unit of the British Army
 111th Regiment of Foot (1761), a unit of the British Army
 111th Infantry Regiment (United States), a unit of the United States Army
111th Armored Cavalry Regiment, a unit of the United States Army National Guard
111th Cavalry Regiment, a unit of the United States Army National Guard

See also
 111th Division (disambiguation)
 111 Squadron (disambiguation)